Joel Jahn (born 10 January 1934) is a Finnish sailor. He competed in the Dragon event at the 1956 Summer Olympics.

References

External links
 

1934 births
Living people
Finnish male sailors (sport)
Olympic sailors of Finland
Sailors at the 1956 Summer Olympics – Dragon
Sportspeople from Helsinki